Mill Village may refer to:

 Mill village, a settlement that developed around one or more mills or factories
 Mill Village, Nova Scotia, Canada
 Mill Village, Pennsylvania, United States

See also

 Mooresville Mill Village
 Peppermill Village, Maryland
 Spring Mill Village, Indiana